Henry S. Ensher (1959-) is an American Career Foreign Service Officer who served as Ambassador Extraordinary and Plenipotentiary to Algeria from 2011 until 2014.  He's also served as deputy assistant secretary at the State Department's Bureau of South and Central Asian Affairs.  As Deputy Assistant Secretary for Central Asia and Afghanistan at the U.S. Department of State, Ensher oversaw U.S. policy towards and diplomatic relations with the five Central Asian states and Afghanistan.

Ensher received his B.A. from Loyola Marymount University.

References

1959 births
Living people
Date of birth missing (living people)
Place of birth missing (living people)
Ambassadors of the United States to Algeria
21st-century American diplomats
Loyola Marymount University alumni